In Greek mythology, Cytisorus or Cytorus or Cylindrus was the founder of Cytorus.

Family 
Cytisorus was the son of Phrixus and Chalciope (Iophassa), daughter of King Aeetes of Colchis. He was the brother of Argus, Melas, Phrontis, and according to some accounts, also of Presbon.

Mythology 
Cytisorus and his brothers were raised in Colchis, but after their father died, he and his brothers set out to avenge their father’s ill treatment in the hands of king Athamas of Orchomenus and were stranded on Island of Ares (Dia) in the Black Sea until they were rescued from the island by Jason and the Argonauts. Once Jason discovered that Cytisorus and his brothers were grandsons of King Aeëtes of Colchis, Jason convinced Cytisorus and his brothers to return with him to Colchis and help him to obtain the Golden Fleece. Jason also questioned Cytisorus and his brothers on the layout and security of the land. After the Fleece was retrieved from Colchis, Phrontis and his brothers returned with the Argo's crew to Greece.

In another version of the myth, the Achaeans were just about to sacrifice Athamas who was a scapegoat to purge the sins of the country according to the command of an oracle but Cytisorus came from Aea in Colchis and delivered his grandfather Athamas. Having done so, Cytisorus brought the wrath of the gods upon his own descendants. In other myths, Sophocles represented Athamas as led to the altar, a victim to the vengeance of Nephele but was saved by Heracles instead.

Notes

References 
 Gaius Julius Hyginus, Fabulae from The Myths of Hyginus translated and edited by Mary Grant. University of Kansas Publications in Humanistic Studies. Online version at the Topos Text Project.
 Gaius Valerius Flaccus, Argonautica translated by Mozley, J H. Loeb Classical Library Volume 286. Cambridge, MA, Harvard University Press; London, William Heinemann Ltd. 1928. Online version at theoi.com.
 Gaius Valerius Flaccus, Argonauticon. Otto Kramer. Leipzig. Teubner. 1913. Latin text available at the Perseus Digital Library.
 Herodotus, The Histories with an English translation by A. D. Godley. Cambridge. Harvard University Press. 1920. . Online version at the Topos Text Project. Greek text available at Perseus Digital Library.
 Hesiod, Catalogue of Women from Homeric Hymns, Epic Cycle, Homerica translated by Evelyn-White, H G. Loeb Classical Library Volume 57. London: William Heinemann, 1914. Online version at theoi.com
 Pausanias, Description of Greece with an English Translation by W.H.S. Jones, Litt.D., and H.A. Ormerod, M.A., in 4 Volumes. Cambridge, MA, Harvard University Press; London, William Heinemann Ltd. 1918. . Online version at the Perseus Digital Library
 Pausanias, Graeciae Descriptio. 3 vols. Leipzig, Teubner. 1903.  Greek text available at the Perseus Digital Library.
 Pseudo-Apollodorus, The Library with an English Translation by Sir James George Frazer, F.B.A., F.R.S. in 2 Volumes, Cambridge, MA, Harvard University Press; London, William Heinemann Ltd. 1921. . Online version at the Perseus Digital Library. Greek text available from the same website.
 Stephanus of Byzantium, Stephani Byzantii Ethnicorum quae supersunt, edited by August Meineike (1790-1870), published 1849. A few entries from this important ancient handbook of place names have been translated by Brady Kiesling. Online version at the Topos Text Project.
 Strabo, The Geography of Strabo. Edition by H.L. Jones. Cambridge, Mass.: Harvard University Press; London: William Heinemann, Ltd. 1924. Online version at the Perseus Digital Library.
 Strabo, Geographica edited by A. Meineke. Leipzig: Teubner. 1877. Greek text available at the Perseus Digital Library.

Family of Athamas
Boeotian characters in Greek mythology